Godfrey Farmhouse is a historic home located at Cohoes in Albany County, New York.  It was built about 1836 and is a -story Greek Revival temple form dwelling.  It features an impressive portico with fluted columns.

It was listed on the National Register of Historic Places in 1979.

References

Houses on the National Register of Historic Places in New York (state)
Greek Revival houses in New York (state)
Houses completed in 1836
Houses in Albany County, New York
National Register of Historic Places in Albany County, New York